The 2017 World Games, commonly known as Wrocław 2017, was the tenth World Games, a major international multi-sport event, meant for sports, or disciplines or events within a sport, that were not contested in the Olympic Games, held from 20 to 30 July 2017 in Wrocław, Poland. The World Games were organized by the Wrocław Organizing Committee. Wrocław was selected as the host city in January 2012 in Lausanne, over Budapest, Hungary. It was the first time The World Games was organised in Poland.

Wrocław was the sixth city in Europe after London (1985), Karlsruhe (1989), The Hague (1993), Lahti (1997) and Duisburg (2005) to host The World Games.

A total of 201 events in 27 official sport disciplines were held during the Games. This is the first time that floorball, women's lacrosse, and Muay Thai have been included in The World Games as official sports. Also, a total of 21 events in 4 invitational sports, American football, indoor rowing, kickboxing, and motorcycle speedway were held during the Games.

Host selection

Four cities expressed interest in hosting the 2017 Games. After examination of the files, the application of Genoa, Italy was not brought to the next step. The candidate cities were announced by the IWGA in August 2011:
 Budapest, Hungary
 Cape Town, South Africa
 Wrocław, Poland
Just a few days before the awarding ceremony, Cape Town withdrew its bid for financial reasons. The final decision was announced by Ron Froehlich, President of the International World Games Association, on 12 January 2012 in Lausanne. The 10th edition of The World Games was awarded to Wrocław.

Venues

West Cluster

The West Cluster was the main clusters of the games, include the opening ceremony venue, Stadion Miejski, the venue of the 2012 UEFA European Football Championship in Poland and Ukraine.

Stadion Miejski – opening ceremony, 42,771 spectators
Millennium Park – roller speed skating 	
Orbita Hall – kickboxing, muay thai, 3,000 spectators
Orbita Swimming Pool – canoe polo, finswimming, lifesaving
Stara Odra River – waterskiing, wakeboarding

Central Cluster

National Forum of Music – closing ceremony, powerlifting, 1,800 spectators
Nowy Targ Square – orienteering, sport climbing
Sky Tower Housed – bowling
Hasta la Vista Sport Club – Squash

East Cluster

Centennial Hall – acrobatic gymnastic, aerobic gymnastics, dancesport, rhythmic gymnastics, trampoline gymnastics, Tumbling, 10,000 spectators
Wroclaw Congress Center – billiards
Pergola Centennial Hall – archery, boules sports, orienteering, 10,000 spectators
Olympic Stadium – American football, motorcycle speedway, 35,000 spectators
University of Physical Education – tug of war
Marsowe Fields – tug of war
P5 Complex – beach handball, flying disc
WKK Sport Center – floorball, korfball
Sport Complex GEM – ju-jitsu, karate
Olawka Stadium – fistball, lacrosse

Outside Wrocław

Szymanów Airport, Szymanów – air sports
Trzebnica Beech Forest, Trzebnica – orienteering
Świdnica Icerink, Świdnica – artistic roller skating, inline hockey
Laskowice Sport Complex, Jelcz-Laskowice – indoor rowing

The events

Opening ceremony

The opening ceremony took place in the Stadion Miejski on 20 July 2017. Artistic conception of the opening Ceremony was implemented by Polish director and TV producer, Krzysztof Materna, who was responsible for the direction of the show, scenario details, artistry, choreography, composition, sound system specialties and all special effects of the ceremony.

The ceremony highlighted aspects of Polish culture and featured the popular singer, Dawid Kwiatkowski, and Radzimir Dębski, Kamil Bednarek, and Steve Nash alongside the Turntable Orchestra. The Games were officially opened by President of International Olympic Committee, Thomas Bach.

Sports 
The 2017 World Games programme featured 27 official sports, and 4 invitational sports encompassing 219 events. This was the first time that floorball, women's lacrosse, and Muay Thai were included in the World Games as official sports, and the first time indoor rowing, kickboxing and motorcycle speedway were included as invitational sports. The numbers in parentheses indicate the number of medal events contested in each sports discipline.

AD
AD
T
I
P
AD
B
P
P
B
P
AD
T
B
B
T
I
T
M
M
I
B
B
T
M
T
S
AD
T
I
T
B
M
T
AD
S
T

Notes
AD: Artistic and Dance sports
B: Ball sports
I: Invitational sports, selected by the host city
M: Martial arts
P: Precision sports
S: Strength sports
T: Trend sports

Participating nations

Closing ceremony
The closing ceremony was held on 30 July 2017 at Wolności Square near the National Forum of Music in Wrocław.

Calendar

Medal table

Medal design
Wrocław's medal design was unveiled in July 2017. The official sports medals were a diameter of eight centimetres, larger than the invitation sports medals which were a diameter of six centimetres. The face of the medals features The World Games logo, while the reverse displays original work by Professor Mateusz Dworski. In the centre of the medal is a globe containing the image of the Wrocław City Hall building. The medals were designed by Dworski, a lecturer at the Academy of Fine Arts in Wrocław, and were produced by the Polish National Mint.

This is the table of the medal count of the 2017 World Games, based on the medal count of the International World Games Committee (IWGA). These rankings sort by the number of gold medals, earned by a National Olympic Committee (NOC). The number of silver medals is taken into consideration next and then the number of bronze medals. If, after the above, countries are still tied, equal ranking is given and they are listed alphabetically by IWGA Country Code. Although this information is provided by the IWGA, the IWGA itself does not recognize or endorse any ranking system.

Official sports
The final medal table:

Invitation sports

Broadcasting
Olympic Channel 
  – Sport1
  – Sportitalia
  – Polsat
  – Match TV
  – UA:First

Marketing

Mascots
The official mascots of the 2017 World Games are a boy and a girl named 'Hansel and Gretel', named after the popular fairy tale and townhouses in Wroclaw. The duo were selected from a nationwide voting in February 2015, and were chosen in November 2015. They symbolise Wroclaw as a place of positive meetings.

Sponsors

References

External links
 The World Games 2017 Wrocław
 Results Book

 
World Games
World Games
Sport in Wrocław
International sports competitions hosted by Poland
2017
Multi-sport events in Poland
July 2017 sports events in Europe